Jaufre is a medieval Arthurian romance in the Occitan language.

Jaufre may also refer to:

Jaufre Rudel (12th century), Occitan nobleman and troubadour
Jaufre de Pons (13th century), Occitan knight and troubadour
Jaufre Reforzat de Trets (13th century), Occitan nobleman and troubadour